Sevastos Kiminitis or Sebastos Kyminites (1630-1703) was a Pontic Greek scholar who was born in a village close to Τrebizond, Pontus. He was principal of the Patriarchal Academy in Constantinople in the years 1671–1682. He left Constantinople in 1682 and moved to Τrebizond where he founded a Greek language school, known as Phrontisterion of Trapezous. Around 1689 he moved to Bucharest to become principal of the Princely Academy of Bucharest. He died there in 1703.

References

External links
 Sevastos Kiminitis

1630 births
1703 deaths
17th-century Greek people
Greek schoolteachers
Ottoman Pontians
People from Trabzon
Greek scholars
Greek expatriates in Romania
Founders of academic institutions
17th-century Greek writers
17th-century Greek educators
17th-century Greek philosophers